Triathlon competitions at the 2021 Junior Pan American Games in Cali, Colombia, were held at the Calima Lake located in the municipality of Darién.

3 medal events were contested.

Medal table

Medallists

References

External links
Triathlon at the 2021 Junior Pan American Games

Pan American Games
Events at the 2021 Junior Pan American Games
Qualification tournaments for the 2023 Pan American Games